The 1982–83 Bulgarian Hockey League season was the 31st season of the Bulgarian Hockey League, the top level of ice hockey in Bulgaria. Six teams participated in the league, and HK CSKA Sofia won the championship.

Standings

Bulgaria
Bulgarian Hockey League seasons
Bulg